Telenovela Channel (informally abbreviated TNC, stylized as TeleNovela Channel) is a telenovela-based cable channel in the Philippine network owned by Beginnings at Twenty Plus, Inc. with the partnership of TelevisaUnivision Mexico. The channel operates non-stop 24/7.

It is the first and only telenovela channel in the Philippines. It aired its first test broadcast from August to September 2011; regular broadcast started on November 14, 2011. First in Asia, the channel will afford viewers the chance to watch their favorite TelevisaUnivision Mexico-produced Mexican telenovelas anytime of the day. The Telenovela Channel has been made possible through a partnership between Beginnings at Twenty Plus, Inc. and TelevisaUnivision Mexico, which is the exclusive producer and international distributor of telenovelas for this channel.

Telenovela Channel is aired on Sky Cable Channel 81 and in more than 150 provincial cable television providers nationwide. On January 4, 2021, the channel aired on Cignal Channel 126 and as a separate feed from SkyCable removing blocktime programming called TV Shop Philippines which is not available on their feed as TV Shop Philippines airs its own 24 hour channel Exclusive for Cignal subscribers on Channel 32.

History

Beginning of the broadcast of telenovelas in the Philippines

During the 90s, The Philippines started to air Latin American telenovelas on free-to-air television networks including RPN 9 (since 1994 with La Traidora), ABS-CBN 2 (since 1996 with Maria Mercedes), ABC 5 (now TV5, since 1996 with Morena Clara), GMA 7 (since 1996 with Agujetas de color de rosa) and IBC 13 (since 2001 with Por un beso). The telenovelas aired on Philippine television, especially those produced in Mexico, were dubbed in Filipino and were shown in primetime and afternoon slots.

However, the late 2000s saw the dwindling popularity of the Latin American telenovelas.

Channel Launch and Initial Programming (2011-2013)

Beginnings at 20 Plus, Inc.  launched a channel dedicated to Mexican telenovelas in 2011. Beginnings at 20 Plus, Inc. is a multi-media company that produces concerts, events and offers television production services as well. The company produced the dubbed Tagalog version of the Chinese historical drama series Judge Bao in 2007–2008, aired on ABC-5.

A landmark agreement between Beginnings at 20 Plus, Inc. and Mexican network Televisa marked the start of a new channel dedicated to telenovelas. On November 14, 2011, Telenovela Channel started its maiden broadcast with In the Name of Love, The Two Sides of Ana, Passion and La Madrastra. These telenovelas were dubbed in Tagalog and were aired in original Spanish audio as well until 2013 as the new telenovelas were dubbed in English.

The year 2012 saw the introduction of new telenovelas as well. These are A Woman's Word, Big Love, and Love Spell. The same year also marked the return of Marimar, this time on cable via this channel. With its aim to be a purely Filipino telenovela cable channel, Spanish audio versions of the telenovelas were stopped in order to give way to Tagalog dubbed shows. On August 13 to 19, 2012, episodes of various telenovelas were aired again by viewers' request due to brownouts caused by strong monsoon rains (Habagat) on August 7 to 9, 2012.

Transition to English Audio and Programming Changes (2013-2016)

In 2013, the channel made a major shift as the new telenovelas acquired are now dubbed in English starting with Soy tu dueña and Rafaela. In June 2013, the channel's airtime was reduced to give way to Home TV shopping blocktimer TeleVShop which was later replaced by TV Shop Philippines in 2014.

On June 2, 2014, the telenovela returned on Free TV as The Two Sides of Ana (Dalawang Mukha ni Ana) during ATC @ IBC-13 block. On July 7, 2014, Telenovela Channel launched the return of the popular telenovela Cuidado con el ángel, under the English title Don't Mess with an Angel. The said telenovela already aired on ABS-CBN as Maria de Jesus: Ang Anghel sa Lansangan, dubbed in Tagalog from 2009 until it ended in 2010. Also in 2014, reruns of last 5-10 episodes of each telenovela were aired, afterwards a new telenovela was replaced. As of 2015, no full-length reruns of telenovelas aired after the rerun of The One who Couldn't Love. Since April 2015, all telenovelas and an anthology are aired in English.

Exploring New Genres & Remakes to Pandemic Programming Interruption (2017-present)

On January 16, 2017, Telenovela Channel aired its first non-telenovela program "The Rose of Guadalupe" an anthology featuring standalone inspirational stories each episode. Three new novelas subsequently aired on summer: Head Over Heels, I Don't Trust Men Anymore and La Malquerida.

For the first time, Telenovela Channel launched its first Brazilian telenovela Carrossel, which is a remake of the 1989 telenovela Carrusel. The telenovela, produced by SBT and distributed by Televisa (for international markets), replaced I Don't Trust Men Anymore on October 23, 2017. With 252 episodes using the international version (instead of 310 in the original airing), this is the overall longest-running telenovela aired on TNC, although Big Love (2012-2013) remains the longest running Mexican soap opera with 205 episodes.

Two programs premiered on New Year's Day of 2018: My Heart is Yours and The Color of Passion. I Don't Trust Men Anymore had its repeat broadcast in July 2018, the first program to have a full run rerun since The One Who Couldn't Love in 2015. Secrets at the Hotel was launched on September 3, 2017, replacing La Rosa de Guadalupe. This is the second-period soap opera the channel aired after Passion in 2011. Simply María, a remake of the 1989 telenovela (already aired on RPN from 1996 to 1997), was launched on September 17, 2018. Fooled Into Love and Ask God for Forgiveness Not Me premiered in late November as 2018 draws to an end.

Telenovela Channel aired the program Corazón indomable under the title Wild at Heart in January 2019. The said telenovela was already shown on GMA Network in 2015, with a slightly reduced number of episodes along with Tagalog audio. This is the third time a previously Tagalog-dubbed telenovela on free TV will be aired in English on TNC after Don't Mess with an Angel and Rubi. Wild at Heart is based on the 1994 telenovela Marimar which was broadcast on TNC in 2012. Alongside with it is the launch of The Stray Cat, which is produced by Nathallie Lartilleux, the same producer of Wild at Heart.

In June 2019, Telenovela Channel premiered three telenovelas on the same day: The Three Sides of Ana, Las Amazonas and Unforgivable. In September 2019, Telenovela Channel aired telenovelas The Neighbor and Passion and Power which was the last telenovela that famous actor Fernando Colunga starred in Televisa. In January 2020, three new programs premiered: Anything But Plain, Shadows of the Past and Along Came Love. Due to the Enhanced Community Quarantine imposed by the Philippine government, as a preventive measure to the COVID-19 pandemic, office operations were affected and thus the channel was forced to air reruns from April to June 2020 except Passion and Power which finished its broadcast in early April followed by a rerun of the program's last few weeks until May. In July 2020, TeleNovela Channel resumed regular programming with new episodes. After the three new shows ended their runs in October–November, the channel aired reruns of The Neighbor, Passion and Power,  The Three Sides of Ana and Las Amazonas.

In February 2021, TeleNovela Channel premiered two new programs: Sightless Love and Fall Into Temptation. It was then followed by My Husband's Family in May, Lying Heart in June and the 2 telenovelas, The Candidate and In Love with Ramón in July. In celebration of its 10th Anniversary, the channel launched three new shows in October, I Plead Guilty, It Had to Be You and Papa a Toda Madre.

Currently aired programs

Telenovelas
Note: All telenovelas are dubbed in English audio.

 Italian Bride (October 10, 2022 – present)
 Mi Pecado (January 2, 2023 – present)
 Corazon Salvaje *(January 16, 2023 – present) 
 The Two Lives of Estela Carrillo* (January 16, 2023 – present)   
*Rerun

Blocktimer
 Note: Not available in Cignal / Cignal Play
 TV Shop Philippines  (2014 – present)

Previously aired programs

Telenovelas
Tagalog-dubbed telenovelas (2011–2013)
 Passion - first airing (November 16, 2011 – March 25, 2012), Reruns (March 26, 2012 – August 3, 2012; December 24, 2012 – March 29, 2013)
 Love Spell - first airing (May – September 14, 2012), Reruns (October 22 – December 30, 2012; February 25, 2013-June 28, 2013)
 The Two Sides of Ana - first airing (November 14, 2011 – May 6, 2012), Reruns-(May 7, 2012 – October 26, 2012; January 28, 2013 – July 12, 2013; broadcast on ATC@IBC-13 - June 2 – August 29, 2014)*
 Big Love - first airing (May 7, 2012 – February 22, 2013), Reruns-(July 1, 2013 – April 11, 2014)
 In the Name of Love - first airing (November 14, 2011 - July 8, 2012), Reruns (September 17, 2012 - March 30, 2013; September 16, 2013 – May 9, 2014)
 Marimar - already aired on RPN (1996), GMA Network (2002 and 2008) and TV5 (2020), first airing (July 9, 2012 – February 8, 2013), Reruns (February 11, 2013 – September 6, 2013; March 24, 2014 – July 4, 2014)
 A Woman's Word first airing (March 26, 2012 – October 21, 2012), Reruns (December 31, 2012 – July 19, 2013; December 8, 2014 – March 27, 2015)
 La Madrastra - first airing (November 14, 2011 – May 6, 2012), Reruns (August 6, 2012 – January 25, 2013; September 9, 2013 – February 21, 2014; February 16 – May 15, 2015 [Spanish audio only])

"*"-aired on  BEAM Channel 31 from 2015 to 2016

English-dubbed telenovelas (since 2013)
 Rafaela - first airing (April 1 – September 13, 2013), Reruns (October 21, 2013 – April 4, 2014)
 A Woman of Steel - first airing (April 1 – October 18, 2013), Reruns (February 24, 2014 – September 19, 2014)
Triumph of Love - First airing (July 22, 2013 – March 21, 2014), Reruns (April 7, 2014 – December 5, 2014)
 The Power of Destiny (April 14, 2014 – September 19, 2014), reruns (September 22, 2014 – February 13, 2015)
 Don't Mess with an Angel - already aired as Maria de Jesus: Ang Anghel sa Lansangan on ABS-CBN (2009–2010); first airing (July 7, 2014 – April 17, 2015)
 The One Who Couldn't Love first airing (May 12, 2014 – January 9, 2015), reruns (January 12 – September 1, 2015)
 Abyss of Passion (April 13, 2015 – January 15, 2016)
 Rubí - already aired on ABS-CBN in 2005 and remade into a Philippine adaptation (April 20, 2015 – January 15, 2016)
 Valiant Love (May 18, 2015 – February 26, 2016)
 The Lady from Vendaval (September 28, 2015 – June 17, 2016)
 Crown of Tears (January 18 – July 1, 2016)
 Timeless Love (January 18 – September 29, 2016)
The Tempest (June 20, 2016 – January 13, 2017)
Life of Lies (October 10, 2016 – March 24, 2017)
 What Life Took From Me (July 4, 2016 – April 21, 2017)
 A Shelter for Love (October 10, 2016 – June 16, 2017)
 Head Over Heels (March 27, 2017 – December 31, 2017)
 La Malquerida (June 19, 2017 – December 31, 2017)
 The Color of Passion (January 1, 2018 – June 30, 2018)
 My Heart is Yours (January 1, 2018 – September 14, 2018)
 Carrossel (October 23, 2017 – October 8, 2018)
 I Don't Trust Men Anymore (April 24, 2017 – October 20, 2017, reruns: July 1, 2018 – December 20, 2018)
 Secrets at the Hotel  (September 3 – December 21, 2018, last 20 episodes rerun on December 24, 2018 – January 25, 2019)
 Simply María (September 17, 2018 – March 22, 2019)
 Fooled Into Love (November 19, 2018 – May 31, 2019)
 Ask God for Forgiveness Not Me (November 19, 2018 – May 31, 2019)
 The Stray Cat (January 28 – July 26, 2019)
 Las Amazonas (June 3 – September 6, 2019, rerun Aug 31 – November 29, 2020)
 Wild at Heart (January 28 – September 20, 2019; already aired on GMA Network as Corazón indomable in 2015)
 The Three Sides of Ana (June 3, 2019 – January 5, 2020, rerun November 30, 2020–February 14, 2021)
 Unforgivable (June 3, 2019 – January 5, 2020)
 Passion and Power (September 23, 2019 – May 24, 2020, rerun October 19, 2020–May 9, 2021)
The Neighbor (September 9, 2019 – August 30, 2020, rerun October 26, 2020 – July 18, 2021)
 Anything But Plain (January 6, 2020 – October 18, 2020)
 Shadows of the Past (January 6, 2020 – October 25, 2020)
 Along Came Love (January 6, 2020 – November 1, 2020)
 Fall Into Temptation (February 1 – June 25, 2021)
 Sightless Love (February 1 – July 9, 2021)
 My Husband's Family (May 10, 2021 – October 3, 2021)
 Lying Heart (June 28, 2021 – October 3, 2021)
 The Candidate (July 12 – October 11, 2021)
 In Love with Ramón (July 19, 2021 – January 2, 2022)
 I Plead Guilty (October 4, 2021 – January 2, 2022)
 It Had to Be You (October 4, 2021 – February 6, 2022)
 Papá a toda madre (October 11, 2021 – March 6, 2022)
 The Two Lives of Estela Carrillo (January 3, 2022 – April 17, 2022)
 The Dark Widow (January 3, 2022 – May 1, 2022)
 Road to Destiny (March 7, 2022 – September 4, 2022)
 Corazon Salvaje (March 7, 2022 – September 11, 2022)
 A Beloved Man (May 2, 2022 – September 18, 2022)
 My Sweet Curse (April 18, 2022 – October 9, 2022)
 Wild Lands (September 5, 2022 – January 1,2023)
 Love to Death (September 12, 2022 – January 15, 2023)
 Moon Daughters (September 19, 2022 – January 15, 2023)

Drama anthology
The Rose of Guadalupe (January 16, 2017 – August 31, 2018, English-dubbed)

Other programming and segments
 TeleBalita (2011–2012)
 Telemusika (2011–2012) 
 TeleTrivia (2011–2013), (2018)
 David's Salon Makeover Tricks and Tips (2011–2014) 
 TeleVShop (2013–2014) 
 Rough Draft (2014–2015)

Upcoming programs

References

External links

Television channels and stations established in 2011
Television networks in the Philippines
English-language television stations in the Philippines
2011 establishments in the Philippines